The Cortez Mountains are located in north central Nevada in the United States. The range lies in a southwest-northeasterly direction between Crescent Valley and Pine Valley. Mount Tenabo is the principal peak of the range, at 9,153 feet above sea level. Surrounding ranges include: the Shoshone Range to the northwest, the Pinon and Sulphur Springs ranges to the east, the Simpson Park Mountains to the south and the Toiyabe Range to the southwest across the narrow Cortez Canyon.

The Bureau of Land Management oversees 70% of the range, while privately held land accounts for the other 30%. Vegetation is primarily pinyon-juniper, montane shrub, and sagebrush steppe. At least four different species of mice live in the range. The side-blotched lizard and the chisel-toothed kangaroo rat are also found in the mountains.

The range is named after Hernán Cortés, the 16th-century Spanish conquistador.

References

Biological Resources Research Center - 
Nevada Atlas & Gazetteer, 2001, pg. 38

Mountain ranges of Eureka County, Nevada
Mountain ranges of Nevada